The saxicoline sunskink (Lampropholis mirabilis) is a species of skink, a lizard in the family Scincidae. The species is endemic to Queensland in Australia.

References

Skinks of Australia
Endemic fauna of Australia
Reptiles described in 1981
Lampropholis
Taxa named by Glen Joseph Ingram
Taxa named by Peter Alan Rawlinson